Boban Marjanović (born August 15, 1988) is a Serbian professional basketball player for the Houston Rockets of the National Basketball Association (NBA). He also plays for the Serbian national basketball team in international competitions. In 2015, he earned an All-EuroLeague First Team selection. He is also an actor, having appeared in several films. He is currently the tallest NBA player with a height of 2.24 m.

Early life
Marjanović was born and raised in Boljevac in eastern Serbia. A pituitary gland condition is thought to have contributed to his gigantism.

Marjanović began playing basketball with the youth teams of Boljevac-based club Rtanj. He played in their youth categories until the 2005–06 season.

Professional career

Hemofarm (2006–2010) 
Marjanović joined Hemofarm's first team, playing in the Adriatic League, in the second half of the 2005–06 season. He played there until January 2007 when he was loaned to the Serbian League team Swisslion Takovo. After half a season there, he returned to Hemofarm. His teammates included Stefan Marković and Milan Mačvan, with whom he had played on the Serbian junior national team.

CSKA Moscow (2010–2011) 
In the summer of 2010, Marjanović signed a three-year contract with CSKA Moscow, on the insistence of Duško Vujošević.

Žalgiris (2011) 
After Vujošević was fired, Marjanović lost his place in CSKA's first team. On December 31, 2010, he was loaned to Žalgiris, until the end of the 2010–11 season.

Nizhny Novgorod (2011–2012) 
In July 2011, Marjanović signed for Nizhny Novgorod, staying there for half a season.

Radnički Kragujevac (2012) 
In January 2012, Marjanović returned to Serbia and signed for Radnički Kragujevac on loan for the rest of the 2011–12 season.

Mega Vizura (2012–2013) 
In July 2012, Marjanović signed a contract with Serbian team Mega Vizura for the 2012–13 season. He was named the MVP of the Serbian League.

Crvena zvezda (2013–2015) 
On July 2, 2013, Marjanović signed a two-year contract with Crvena zvezda. In December 2013, he was named EuroLeague MVP of the Round for Round 10. In April 2014, along with his teammate DeMarcus Nelson, he was selected for the Ideal Team for the 2013–14 ABA League season.

In the first game of the 2014–15 EuroLeague season, Marjanović led his team to a 76–68 victory against Galatasaray, scoring 22 points and pulling down 10 rebounds in 28 minutes on the court. He was later named the EuroLeague MVP of the Round for Round 1. On November 22, 2014, he recorded 23 points and a career-high 17 rebounds, for a total index rating of 39 in a double overtime 103–110 loss against Galatasaray. At the time, his 17 rebounds in a single game was the highest number by any player in the EuroLeague since 2011–12.

On April 9, in a game against Panathinaikos, he set the EuroLeague record since the 2000–01 season for the most rebounds in a single season with 256, passing the previous record of Mirsad Türkcan, who had 248 rebounds in the 2002–03 season. He also set the EuroLeague record for the most double-doubles in a season with 16, surpassing the record of 14 set by Tanoka Beard in the 2004–05 season. Over 24 EuroLeague games, he averaged all career-highs of 16.6 points, a league-leading 10.7 rebounds and a record (since the EuroLeague 2000–01 season) of 25.67 in PIR.

On April 2, 2015, he was selected for the Ideal Team for the 2014–15 ABA League season. Later that month, he helped his team to win the 2014–15 ABA League trophy. He was named the MVP of the ABA League playoffs. In May 2015, he was chosen for the All-EuroLeague First Team.

On June 5, 2015, Marjanović was named the Serbian Super League MVP for the third consecutive season, having helped his team to reach first place in the regular season with a record of 13–1. Crvena zvezda won the 2014–15 Serbian League championship after a 3–0 series victory over Partizan Belgrade.

San Antonio Spurs (2015–2016)
On July 17, 2015, Marjanović signed a one-year, $1.2 million contract with the San Antonio Spurs. He made his NBA debut on October 30, recording six points and five rebounds in the Spurs' 102–75 win over the Brooklyn Nets. On December 4, he was assigned to the Austin Spurs, San Antonio's D-League affiliate. He was recalled by San Antonio on December 6, and, the following day, scored 18 points on 8-of-10 shooting in a 119–68 win over the Philadelphia 76ers. On December 28, in a win over the Minnesota Timberwolves, with Tim Duncan out injured and LaMarcus Aldridge limited to six points, Marjanović scored 17 points on 7-of-7 shooting in 14 minutes to help the Spurs defeat the Timberwolves 101–95 and extend their franchise-record home winning streak to 27 games (dating to 2014–15 season). Two days later, in a win over the Phoenix Suns, he became the first player in Spurs franchise history to record 12 rebounds in 15 minutes or less. On January 21, 2016, he recorded 17 points and a career-high 13 rebounds in a 117–89 win over the Phoenix Suns. On March 20, he was reassigned to the Austin Spurs, earning a recall two days later. On March 23, he scored a then career-high 19 points in a 112–88 win over the Miami Heat. On April 13, in the team's regular season finale, Marjanović recorded a career-high 22 points and 12 rebounds in a 96–91 win over the Dallas Mavericks.

Detroit Pistons (2016–2018)
After the 2015–16 season, Marjanović became a restricted free agent. On July 7, 2016, he received a three-year, $21 million offer sheet from the Detroit Pistons. The Spurs declined to match the offer and he signed with the Pistons on July 12. On January 5, 2017, Marjanović recorded 15 points and a career-high 19 rebounds in a 115–114 win over the Charlotte Hornets. He had played only 76 minutes all season prior to the game against the Hornets but, with Andre Drummond in foul trouble and Aron Baynes out injured, coach Stan Van Gundy was forced to give Marjanović extended minutes. On April 7, 2017, he led the Pistons with a career-high 27 points and 12 rebounds off the bench in a 114–109 win over the Houston Rockets.

Los Angeles Clippers (2018–2019)
On January 29, 2018, Marjanović, along with Tobias Harris, Avery Bradley, a future protected first-round draft pick and a future second round draft pick, was traded to the Los Angeles Clippers in exchange for Blake Griffin, Willie Reed and Brice Johnson. On February 27, 2018, he scored a season-high 18 points in a 122–120 win over the Denver Nuggets.

Philadelphia 76ers (2019)
On February 6, 2019, Marjanović alongside his teammate Tobias Harris was traded to the Philadelphia 76ers. In 22 appearances for the 76ers in the regular season, Marjanović averaged 8.2 points and 5.1 rebounds in 13.9 minutes per game. He later helped the 76ers get past the Brooklyn Nets in the first round of the 2019 NBA playoffs, but the 76ers were eventually eliminated by the Toronto Raptors in the Conference Semi-finals.

Dallas Mavericks (2019–2022)
On July 23, 2019, Marjanović signed with the Dallas Mavericks.

On March 11, 2020, Marjanović scored a career-high 31 points, along with 17 rebounds, in a 113–97 win over the Denver Nuggets, in what was the final game before the season was suspended due to the COVID-19 pandemic.

On August 10, 2021, Marjanović re-signed with the Mavericks.

Houston Rockets (2022–present) 
On June 24, 2022, Marjanović was traded alongside Trey Burke, Marquese Chriss, Sterling Brown, and the draft rights to Wendell Moore Jr., to the Houston Rockets in exchange for Christian Wood. On February 9, 2023, the Rockets waived Marjanović, as a result of a three-team trade. On February 13, he was re-signed by the Rockets.

National team career

As a junior national team player with Serbia, Marjanović won gold medals at the 2007 FIBA Under-19 World Championship and the 2008 FIBA Europe Under-20 Championship. He was named on the candidates list before both the EuroBasket 2009 and the 2010 FIBA World Championship, but did not get in the final 12-man squads. His senior debut with the Serbian national basketball team at a major tournament came at EuroBasket 2011 in Lithuania, where Serbia finished in eighth place.

In August 2015, the San Antonio Spurs prohibited him from playing for the Serbian national team at EuroBasket 2015 due to risk of injury after signs of pain in his left foot, although the Serbian Basketball Federation (KSS) stated that no bone fractures were found.

Marjanović represented Serbia at EuroBasket 2017. They won the silver medal, losing the final to Slovenia. Over 9 tournament games, he averaged 12.4 points, 4.8 rebounds and 1.4 assists per game on 56.2% shooting from the field.

At the 2019 FIBA Basketball World Cup, the national team of Serbia was considered a favorite to win the trophy, but was eventually upset in the quarter-finals by Argentina. With wins over the United States and Czech Republic, it finished in fifth place. Marjanović averaged 6.8 points and 2.5 rebounds over 8 games.

Career statistics

NBA

Regular season

|-
| style="text-align:left;"|
| style="text-align:left;"|San Antonio
| 54 || 4 || 9.4 || .603 ||  || .763 || 3.6 || .4 || .2 || .4 || 5.5
|-
| style="text-align:left;"|
| style="text-align:left;"|Detroit
| 35 || 0 || 8.4 || .545 ||  || .810 || 3.7 || .3 || .2 || .3 || 5.5
|-
| style="text-align:left;" rowspan=2|
| style="text-align:left;"|Detroit
| 19 || 1 || 9.0 || .519 ||  || .800 || 3.0 || .7 || .2 || .3 || 6.2
|-
| style="text-align:left;"|L.A. Clippers
| 20 || 0 || 8.3 || .551 ||  || .788 || 4.4 || .4 || .3 || .3 || 5.9
|-
| style="text-align:left;" rowspan=2|
| style="text-align:left;"|L.A. Clippers
| 36 || 9 || 10.4 || .607 || .000 || .758 || 4.2 || .6 || .3 || .5 || 6.7
|-
| style="text-align:left;"|Philadelphia
| 22 || 3 || 13.9 || .625 || .500 || .722 || 5.1 || 1.5 || .2 || .5 || 8.2
|-
| style="text-align:left;"| 
| style="text-align:left;"| Dallas
| 44 || 5 || 9.6 || .573 || .235 || .754 || 4.5 || .5 || .2 || .2 || 6.6
|-
| style="text-align:left;"| 
| style="text-align:left;"| Dallas
| 33 || 3 || 8.2 || .508 || .125 || .816 || 3.9 || .3 || .1 || .2 || 4.7
|-
| style="text-align:left;"| 
| style="text-align:left;"| Dallas
| 23 || 0 || 5.6 || .600 || .250 || .591 || 1.7 || .1 || .0 || .1 || 4.3
|-
| style="text-align:left;"| 
| style="text-align:left;"| Houston
| 17 || 0 || 4.2 || .667 || .000 || .786 || 1.5 || .2 || .1 || .1 || 2.8
|-class="sortbottom"
| style="text-align:center;" colspan="2"|Career
| 303 || 25 || 9.0 || .576 || .250 || .766 || 3.7 || .5 || .2 || .3 || 5.7

Playoffs

|-
| style="text-align:left;"|
| style="text-align:left;"|San Antonio
| 7 || 0 || 6.0 || .667 ||  || .889 || 2.0 || .4 || .0 || .3 || 3.4
|-
| style="text-align:left;"|
| style="text-align:left;"|Philadelphia
| 11 || 0 || 9.5 || .600 || .000 || .842  || 3.3 || 1.0 || .2 ||  .3 || 5.8
|-
| style="text-align:left;"| 
| style="text-align:left;"| Dallas
| 6 || 0 || 13.7 || .567 || .000 || .778 || 5.8 || .8 || .0 || .3 || 6.8
|-
| style="text-align:left;"| 
| style="text-align:left;"| Dallas
| 4 || 3 || 20.8 || .513 ||  || .778 || 8.0 || 1.0 || .0 || .3 || 11.3
|-
| style="text-align:left;"| 
| style="text-align:left;"| Dallas
| 3 || 0 || 2.0 || .250 ||  || 1.000 || 1.0 || .0 || .3 || .0 || 1.3
|-class="sortbottom"
| style="text-align:center;" colspan="2"|Career 
| 31 || 3 || 10.3 || .560 || .000  || .833 || 3.9 || .7 || .1 || .3 || 5.8

EuroLeague

|-
| style="text-align:left;"|2010–11
| style="text-align:left;"|CSKA Moscow
| 8 || 3 || 11.4 || .458 || .000 || .923 || 3.5 || .4 || .6 || .6 || 4.3 || 5.6
|-
| style="text-align:left;"|2010–11
| style="text-align:left;"|Žalgiris
| 6 || 1 || 12.3 || .647 || .000 || .643 || 3.5 || .3 || .2 || .5 || 5.2 || 5.7
|-
| style="text-align:left;"|2013–14
| style="text-align:left;" rowspan=2|Crvena zvezda
| 10 || 9 || 19.9 || .616 || .000 || .621 || 7.7 || 1.0 || .9 || .8 || 10.8 || 15.2
|-
| style="text-align:left;"|2014–15
| 24 || 24 || 27.3 || style="background:#CFECEC;"| .621* || .000 || .781 || style="background:#CFECEC;"|10.7* || 1.0 || .4 || .9 || 16.6 || style="background:#CFECEC;"|25.7*
|-class="sortbottom"
| style="text-align:center;" colspan="2"|Career
| 48 || 37 || 21.3 || .610 || .000 || .755 || 8.0 || .8 || .5 || .8 || 11.9 || 17.7

Appearances in films and television
Marjanović made a cameo appearance as Jānis Krūmiņš in the 2015 Serbian sports drama film We Will Be the World Champions.

In 2019, Marjanović played an assassin named Ernest who quotes Dante's Divine Comedy in the American action thriller John Wick: Chapter 3 – Parabellum and fights John Wick (Keanu Reeves) in the New York Public Library.

In 2021, Marjanović played the grand master in the 1629th episode of the Serbian television comedy show Državni posao. Marjanović is close friends with Tobias Harris, with whom he has been traded twice. Marjanović and Harris appeared in a 2021 series of Goldfish commercials.  Marjanović has also appeared in an advertising campaign for State Farm Insurance.

Marjanović made an appearance in the Netflix film Hustle, produced by LeBron James and Adam Sandler.

See also
 List of European basketball players in the United States
 List of Serbian NBA players
 List of tallest players in National Basketball Association history
 List of tallest people

References

External links

Boban Marjanović at euroleague.net

1988 births
Living people
21st-century Serbian male actors
2019 FIBA Basketball World Cup players
ABA League players
Austin Spurs players
Basketball League of Serbia players
BC Nizhny Novgorod players
BC Žalgiris players
Centers (basketball)
Dallas Mavericks players
Detroit Pistons players
Houston Rockets players
KK Crvena zvezda players
KK Hemofarm players
KK Lions/Swisslion Vršac players
KK Mega Basket players
KK Radnički Kragujevac (2009–2014) players
Los Angeles Clippers players
National Basketball Association players from Serbia
PBC CSKA Moscow players
People from Zaječar
Philadelphia 76ers players
San Antonio Spurs players
Serbia men's national basketball team players
Serbian expatriate basketball people in Lithuania
Serbian expatriate basketball people in Russia
Serbian expatriate basketball people in the United States
Serbian male film actors
Serbian men's basketball players
Undrafted National Basketball Association players